Beaniidae is a small bryozoan family in the cheilostomatan suborder Flustrina and superfamily Buguloidea. Their zooids have a weak box-like shell of calcium carbonate as most Flustrina, and in this family typically arranged disjunctly, connected by small tubes, and often boat-shaped. One species, Amphibiobeania epiphylla, is the only known amphibious bryozoan known as of 2008/09.

Genera
Three genera are unequivocally assigned to this family:
 Amphibiobeania Metcalfe, Gordon & Hayward, 2007
 Beania Johnston, 1840 (including Dimorphozoum)
 Beania magellanica
 Stolonella Hincks, 1883

Footnotes

References
  (2007): An Amphibious Bryozoan from Living Mangrove Leaves – Amphibiobeania new genus (Beaniidae). Zool. Sci.'' 24(6): 563–570.  (HTML abstract)

External links
 Beaniidae photos at bryozoa.net

Bryozoan families
Cheilostomatida